Charlie Mitchell is a Scottish American former soccer defender and coach.  He played ten seasons in the North American Soccer League from 1970 to 1979.

Club career
Mitchell played for St Mirren F.C. in his native Scotland. In 1969, he played in the National Soccer League with Sudbury Italia.

He joined the Rochester Lancers of the NASL in 1970.  The Lancers won the NASL championship in 1970, and Mitchell was named an NASL all-star.  He was an NASL second-team all-star in 1971 and 1975, and an honorable mention all-star in 1972 and 1974. In 1977, he was named to the Rochester Lancers Team of the Decade.

In 1976 Mitchell moved to the New York Cosmos, where he had an assist on a spectacular bicycle kick goal scored by his teammate Pelé in a game against the Miami Toros.

In 1977 Mitchell played for Team Hawaii, where he became player-manager in mid-season.  Team Hawaii moved to Tulsa in 1978 and became the Tulsa Roughnecks; Mitchell was the only player Tulsa retained from the Hawaii roster.

Mitchell played the 1979 season for the Toronto Blizzard, and finished his NASL playing career with a total of 206 NASL regular-season games and nine NASL playoff games. He also served as an assistant coach for Toronto throughout the season.

Coaching career
After ending his playing career, Mitchell returned to Tulsa as manager of the Roughnecks. The 1980 team finished with a 15–17 record and lost to the Cosmos in the first round of the playoffs.   His 1981 team started with an 11–10 record, but in July 1981, Mitchell was replaced by his assistant Terry Hennessey. Sports Illustrated reported that this was due to team management's dissatisfaction with the Roughnecks' low-scoring offense.

Later career
Mitchell remained a popular figure in Tulsa, as a participant in local youth soccer programs, and as a sports bar-restaurant operator.  He coached the men's and women's soccer teams at Northeastern State University in Tahlequah, Oklahoma for nine years until his resignation in June 2005.

References

External links
Charlie Mitchell at North American Soccer League Jerseys

1948 births
Living people
American soccer coaches
American soccer players
New York Cosmos players
North American Soccer League (1968–1984) coaches
North American Soccer League (1968–1984) players
Rochester Lancers (1967–1980) players
Scottish footballers
Scottish expatriate footballers
Scottish emigrants to the United States
St Mirren F.C. players
Team Hawaii players
Toronto Blizzard (1971–1984) players
Tulsa Roughnecks (1978–1984) players
Association football defenders
Scottish expatriate sportspeople in the United States
Expatriate soccer players in the United States
Scottish expatriate sportspeople in Canada
Expatriate soccer players in Canada
Player-coaches
Northeastern State RiverHawks men's soccer coaches
Northeastern State RiverHawks women's soccer coaches
Canadian National Soccer League players